Yangbajing railway station  is a station on the Chinese Qingzang Railway. The town is located in the Southern part of China. It is a high elevation railway that join to Tibet autonomous region of china.

See also

 Qingzang Railway
 List of stations on Qingzang railway

Railway stations in Tibet
Stations on the Qinghai–Tibet Railway